The 1927 Oglethorpe Stormy Petrels football team was an American football team that represented Oglethorpe University as an independent during the 1927 college football season. In their fourth year under head coach Harry J. Robertson, the team compiled an overall record of 2–6.

Schedule

References

Oglethorpe
Oglethorpe Stormy Petrels football seasons
Oglethorpe Stormy Petrels football